Eilhardia is a genus of calcareous sponges in the family Baeriidae. It contains one species, Eilhardia schulzei.

References

Calcaronea
Monotypic sponge genera